Martín Emilio Rodríguez Gutiérrez (born 14 April 1942), known by the nickname Cochise, is a retired Colombian road and track cyclist.

Cochise started his first Vuelta a Colombia in 1961. He would win his first Vuelta two years later in 1963 and would win the event four times in total. He was the road racing champion of Colombia in 1965. He had won gold in the 4,000-metre pursuit at the Central American Games in 1962, the Bolivarian Games in 1965, the American Games in 1965 and 1966 and the Pan-American Games in 1967. Cochise also won Colombia's second most important stage race, the Clásico RCN, in 1963 as well as winning the Vuelta al Táchira in Venezuela three times. On 7 October 1970, Cochise beat the world hour record, with a distance of 47.566 km.

In 1971 in Track World Championships in Varese (Italy), Rodriguez won the Amateurs 4.000ms individual track pursuit beating Swiss Josef Fuchs. Cochise turned professional in 1973 where he won two stages in the Giro d'Italia. Cochise was partnered with the great Italian champion Felice Gimondi for two-man time trial events and won the 1973 Baracchi Trophy and the Verona Grand Prix. Cochise rode the 1975 Tour de France and finished 27th overall. After 1975, Cochise returned to Colombia and competed again as an amateur, winning a final stage in the Vuelta a Colombia in 1980. Cochise is currently involved with a Colombian professional team Indeportes Antioquia that has former time trial world champion Santiago Botero.

The nickname "Cochise" is derived from the fact that he was a great admirer of the Apache chief Cochise.

He also competed at the 1964 Summer Olympics and the 1968 Summer Olympics.

Major results

Road

1961
 1st Stage 3 Vuelta a Colombia
1962
 2nd Overall Vuelta a Colombia
1st Stages 5 & 13
 2nd  Team time trial, Central American and Caribbean Games
1963
 1st  Overall Vuelta a Colombia
1st Stages 3, 4, 6, 8, 15 & 16
 1st  Overall Clásico RCN
1964
 1st  Overall Vuelta a Colombia
1st Stages 3, 7, 9, 10, 11, 13, 15, 16 & 19
1965
 2nd Overall Vuelta a Colombia
1st Stage 5
1966
 1st  Overall Vuelta a Colombia
1st Stages 3, 5, 6, 8, 9, 10, 13 & 18
 1st  Overall Vuelta al Táchira
1st Stages 3 & 5
 Central American and Caribbean Games
1st  Road race
1st  Team time trial
1967
 1st  Overall Vuelta a Colombia
1st Stages 6, 10, 13 & 18
1968
 1st Overall Vuelta al Táchira
 7th Overall Vuelta a Colombia
1st Stage 9
 9th Road race, Summer Olympics
1969
 2nd Overall Vuelta a Colombia
1st Stages 3 & 8
1970
 1st  Team time trial, Central American and Caribbean Games
 1st Stage 8 Vuelta a Colombia
1971
 1st  Overall Vuelta al Táchira
 1st Stage 11 Vuelta a Colombia
1972
 1st Stages 3 & 9 Vuelta a Colombia
 3rd Overall Clásico RCN
1973
 1st Gran Premio Città di Camaiore
 1st Trofeo Baracchi (with Felice Gimondi)
 1st Stage 15 Giro d'Italia
 3rd Giro di Romagna
1974
 2nd Trofeo Baracchi (with Gösta Pettersson)
 3rd GP du canton d'Argovie
 3rd GP Forli
 5th GP Lugano
 7th Gran Premio Città di Camaiore
1975
 1st Stage 19 Giro d'Italia
 1st Overall Cronostaffetta (TTT)
1st Stage 1a (ITT)
 9th Milano–Torino
 10th Giro del Veneto
1980
 1st Stage 10 Vuelta a Colombia

Grand Tour general classification results timeline

Track

1962
 1st  Individual pursuit, Central American and Caribbean Games
1965
 Bolivarian Games
1st  Individual pursuit
1st  Team pursuit
1966
 1st  Individual pursuit, Central American and Caribbean Games
1967
 1st  Individual pursuit, Pan American Games
1970
 1st  Individual pursuit, Bolivarian Games
 1st  Individual pursuit, Central American and Caribbean Games
1971
 1st  Individual pursuit, UCI Amateur Track World Championships
 Pan American Games
1st  Individual pursuit
1st  Team pursuit

References

1942 births
Living people
Colombian male cyclists
Sportspeople from Medellín
Olympic cyclists of Colombia
Cyclists at the 1964 Summer Olympics
Cyclists at the 1968 Summer Olympics
Pan American Games medalists in cycling
Pan American Games gold medalists for Colombia
Cyclists at the 1967 Pan American Games
Cyclists at the 1971 Pan American Games
Colombian Giro d'Italia stage winners
Giro d'Italia stage winners
Medalists at the 1967 Pan American Games
20th-century Colombian people
21st-century Colombian people